From 1931 to 1939, Daimler-Benz AG produced three cars (Mercedes-Benz 130, 150 and 170 H) with rear engine as well as a few prototypes. The production numbers remained quite low for each of these models, especially compared to the production of classical front-engine Mercedes cars.

Development and prototypes (W17/W25D)

At the beginning of the 1930s, inspired by modern streamlined shapes, there were attempts to move car engines from the forward compartment to the rear of the car. Such a move allows a reduction in the volume of the front compartment. At the same time, the voluminous rear provides a lot of space above and behind the rear axle. Moreover, when engines are rear mounted, the drive shaft is eliminated. The most famous such development was with the 1930s Tatra cars under the leadership of Hans Ledwinka.

In 1930, Daimler-Benz entrusted Hans Nibel with the development of a small rear-engined car, starting from the same principles. In 1931, working with Max Wagner, the type W17 or 120(H) was created, a two-door, equipped with four seats, vertical front and rear wheel arches, and a four-cylinder boxer engine in the rear with a displacement of 1200 cc and a power of 25 hp (18.4 kW). There were also attempts with transverse four-cylinder inline engines. In 1932/1933 Mercedes built a prototype with a front similar to the later VW Beetle, and a longer tail. The tail fin attached to the middle of the hood divides the oval rear window, so it anticipated the small oval two piece rear window of the Beetle known as "pretzel form". The "D" referred to the three-cylinder diesel engine OM 134 with an output of 30 hp (22 kW), but due to high noise level, this vehicle was again rejected. From this type, 12 test cars were assembled

Mercedes-Benz 130 (W23)

The Mercedes-Benz 130H was a low-production automobile built in Germany in the 1930s. It was presented in February 1934 at the Berlin Car Show.

Conceived by Hans Nibel, chief engineer of Mercedes Benz, the 130H was inspired by Edmund Rumpler's Tropfenwagen. It followed on the Rumpler-chassis Tropfenwagen racers, which ran between 1923 and 1926.

Created in 1931 by Nibel, it had the 1.3 liter sidevalve four-cylinder engine mounted at the back, hence the "H", from German heck (rear), With the fan between the rear coil springs, it drove a transmission with three forward speeds, plus a semi-automatic overdrive which did not require the use of a clutch. (A similar idea was adopted by Cord for the abortive 810 in 1935.) The backbone chassis owed something to Hans Ledwinka, and suspension was independent at all four corners. Daimler-Benz put the 130H in production in 1934. Due to its suspension, handling proved poor, although perfectly adequate on German roads at the time, while its ride quality was superior to anything in Germany.

The motor had a power of 26 PS (19 kW) and was able to propel the small two-door sedan at a speed of 92 km/h. The synchronised four-speed gearbox (which would be called later 3 + E by VW) is accommodated in front of the rear axle, the balance being provided by coil springs. The front axle was equipped with two transverse leaf springs.

The car was sold as a sedan, an open-top sedan or a convertible (with and without cabrio cover and without side windows), each being fitted with two doors. Due to its extreme unbalance (⅔ of the mass on the rear axle), the car had very awkward handling. Because of the low sales volume, the model was discontinued in 1936.

Nibel followed the 130H with a more powerful 150H, with chassis designed by Daimler's Max Wagner.

Mercedes-Benz 150 (W30)

The Mercedes-Benz 150H was a prototype sports racing automobile built in Germany in the 1930s. It was derived in 1935 from the 130 with only two seats and a more powerful engine, with 1498 cc and a power of 55 PS (40 kW). The top speed of the car was 125 km/h.

Conceived by Hans Nibel, chief engineer of Mercedes-Benz, the 150H was inspired by Edmund Rumpler's Tropfen-Auto. It followed on the Rumpler-chassis Tropfenwagen racers, which ran between 1923 and 1926, and was based on the backbone chassis of earlier 130H.

Created in 1934 by Nibel and chassis engineer Max Wagner. the 150H was a two-seat sports roadster. It featured transverse leaf spring front and coil-sprung swing axle rear suspension. A water-cooled  OHC four-cylinder engine, producing , was mounted in back, hence the "H", from German heck (rear). The radiator was behind that, above the transaxle, with a squirrel-cage  blower (reminiscent of the VW Type 1) feeding both radiator and carburetor. The roadster featured disc wheels, DuVal-style windshield, side-mounted spare (fastened with straps), and three headlights, the third mounted at the lip of the hood above the bumper.

The car was only offered as a Sport Roadster. The gas tank, which in the case of the Mercedes-Benz 130 was installed over the engine, was transferred to the front compartment, and therefore there was no room for luggage there. The practicality of the 150 was therefore very limited, and the price of the car was quite high at 6600 RM ; as a comparison the Mercedes-Benz 170 V had a price of 5500 RM. The car was discontinued in 1936 due to poor sales.

Six 150Hs were built as coupes, "with low-drag lines that eerily presaged the VW Beetle". They were raced in several rallies, demonstrating much better handling than the 130H, before Nibel and Wagner turned to Grand Prix cars. Only twenty were produced before the 150H was abandoned in 1936.

The last remaining 150 Sport Roadster has been fully restored mechanically by the Mercedes-Benz Classic Center USA in Irvine, California in 2010.

Mercedes-Benz 170 H (W28)

In 1936, in parallel to the classical front-engine Mercedes-Benz 170 V, Daimler-Benz AG introduced the Mercedes-Benz 170 H which had the same engine as the 170 V, with an architecture derived from the one of the 130, its predecessor. The 170 H was powered by a four-cylinder 1697 cc engine with a power of 38 PS (28 kW).  The "H" stood for "Heckmotor", or rear engine.

The car was significantly more expensive than the 170 V (two-door sedan 170 V - 3750 RM, 170 H - 4350 RM) but offered much less room in the trunk, a much louder engine and poor handling (though it handled better than the 130). It was however more comfortably equipped and was therefore considered as a "finer" car, but sold less well than the 170 V. Apart from the sedan, there was still a convertible sedan. Production stopped in 1939 due to the War and the low demand.

Forty years later a company spokesman suggested that the car's relative lack of commercial success was caused by the rear mounting of the engine and the resulting absence of the "characteristic Mercedes-Benz tall radiator".  The same spokesman was at pains to highlight the similarity of the car's overall architecture and some of its detailing to that of the later highly successful Volkswagen Beetle: it was pointed out that Dr Porsche, creator of the Volkswagen, had been chief engineer at Daimler-Benz between 1923 and 1928 when the little rear-engined Mercedes-Benz sedans were under development.

Because these cars, unlike front-engined sister models, were not widely used, and also not suitable for conversion to wood gas generator, they were not confiscated by the Wehrmacht. Therefore, an above-average number of models survived in private hands without damage due to the war,  but most were used to exhaustion in the early post-war years. Today, these cars remain among the rarest and most sought-after Mercedes-Benz models.

In addition, engineer Karl Schlör from the Krauss Maffei company used the 170H chassis to build a pod-like streamliner called the Schlörwagen (nicknamed "Egg" or "Pillbug"). In wind tunnel tests done before the Second World War, it demonstrated the astonishing drag coefficient of only 0.113. It was displayed at the 1939 Berlin Auto Show; its fate is unknown.

Sources
The source of this article is :
 Oswald, Werner: Mercedes-Benz Personenwagen 1886-1986, Motorbuch-Verlag Stuttgart 1987,

External links
 "Tube Forms Auto Chassis and Cools Motor" Popular Science, August 1935 small article on the Model 130

130
Rear-engined vehicles
Cars introduced in 1931
Automobiles with backbone chassis